Paper Roses is the debut studio album by American country music singer Marie Osmond. It was released in 1973 on MGM Records. It was the first of three MGM/Kolob albums Osmond would record as solo artist.

The album's name came from its title track, "Paper Roses," a cover of an Anita Bryant Top 10 hit from 1960. Osmond's version reached #1 on the Billboard Country Chart and #5 on the Billboard Hot 100 in 1973. Osmond became the first female country singer to have a #1 hit with her debut single since Connie Smith with "Once a Day" in 1964. The album includes cover versions of hits by Sonny James ("You're the Only World I Know") and Brenda Lee ("Fool No. 1").

Paper Roses peaked at #1 on the Billboard Top Country Albums chart, #59 on the Billboard 200 and #38 on the Canadian Albums Chart.
The album was reviewed by Allmusic and was given 2 out of 5 stars.

Track listing

Personnel
The Hershel Wiggington Singers, The Jordanaires - backing vocals
Sonny James - arrangements
Cam Mullins - string arrangements
Don Ovens - executive producer
Recorded at Columbia Studios, Studio B Nashville, TN

Chart positions
Album – Billboard (North America)

Singles - Billboard (North America)

References

1973 debut albums
Marie Osmond albums
MGM Records albums